The , also called the Army General Staff, was one of the two principal agencies charged with overseeing the Imperial Japanese Army.

Role
The  was created in April 1872, along with the Navy Ministry, to replace the Ministry of Military Affairs (Hyōbushō) of the early Meiji government.  Initially, the Army Ministry was in charge of both administration and operational command of the Imperial Japanese Army however, from December 1878, the Imperial Army General Staff Office took over all operational control of the Army, leaving the Army Ministry only with administrative functions. The Imperial Army General Staff was thus responsible for the preparation of war plans; the military training and employment of combined arms military intelligence; the direction of troop maneuvers; troop deployments; and the compilation of field service military regulations, military histories, and cartography.

The Chief of the Army General Staff was the senior ranking uniformed officer in the Imperial Japanese Army and enjoyed, along with the War Minister, the Navy Minister, and the Chief of the Navy General Staff, direct access to the Emperor. In wartime, the Imperial Army General Staff formed part of the army section of the Imperial General Headquarters, an ad hoc body under the supervision of the emperor created to assist in coordinating overall command.

History
Following the overthrow of the Tokugawa shogunate in 1867 and the "restoration" of direct imperial rule, the leaders of the new Meiji government sought to reduce Japan's vulnerability to Western imperialism by systematically emulating the technological, governing, social, and military practices of the Western European great powers. Initially, under Ōmura Masujirō and his newly created Ministry of the Military Affairs (Hyōbu-shō), the Japanese military was patterned after that of France. However, the stunning victory of Prussia and the other members of the North German Confederation in the 1870/71 Franco-Prussian War convinced the Meiji oligarchs of the superiority of the Prussian military model and in February 1872, Yamagata Aritomo and Oyama Iwao proposed that the Japanese military be remodeled along Prussian lines. In December 1878, at the urging of Katsura Taro, who had formerly served as a military attaché to Prussia, the Meiji government fully adopted the Prussian/German general staff system (Großer Generalstab) which included the independence of the military from civilian organs of government, thus ensuring that the military would stay above political party maneuvering, and would be loyal directly to the emperor rather than to a Prime Minister who might attempt to usurp the emperor's authority.

The administrative and operational functions of the army were divided between two agencies. A reorganized Ministry of War served as the administrative, supply, and mobilization agency of the army, and an independent Army General Staff had responsibility for strategic planning and command functions. The Chief of the Army General Staff, with direct access to the emperor could operate independently of the civilian government. This complete independence of the military from civilian oversight was codified in the 1889 Meiji Constitution which designated that the Army and Navy were directly under the personal command of the emperor, and not under the civilian leadership or Cabinet.

Yamagata became the first chief of the Army General Staff in 1878. Thanks to Yamagata's influence, the Chief of the Army General Staff became far more powerful than the War Minister. Furthermore, a 1900 imperial ordinance decreed that the two service ministers had to be chosen from among the generals or lieutenant generals (admirals or vice admirals) on the active duty roster. By ordering the incumbent War Minister to resign or by ordering generals to refuse an appointment as War Minister, the Chief of the General Staff could effectively force the resignation of the cabinet or forestall the formation of a new one.

Of the seventeen officers who served as Chief of the Army General Staff between 1879 and 1945, three were members of the Imperial Family (Prince Arisugawa Taruhito, Prince Komatsu Akihito, and Prince Kan'in Kotohito) and thus enjoyed great prestige by virtue of their ties to the Emperor.

The American Occupation authorities abolished the Imperial Army General Staff in September 1945.

Organization
The Organization of the Army General Staff Office underwent a number of changes during its history. Immediately before the start of the Pacific War, it was divided into four operational bureaus and a number of supporting organs:

Chief of the Army General Staff (general or Field Marshal)
Vice Chief of the Army General Staff (lieutenant general)
General Affairs (personnel, accounting, medical, mobilization planning)
G-1 (Operations)
Strategy and Tactics Department
Land Survey Department (or Land Surveying Bureau)
G-2 (Intelligence)
Russia Department
Europe and North America Department
China Department
Others Department
G-3 (Transport & Communications)
G-4 (Historical and Maps)
G-5 (Fortifications) [from Jan 1889 – Dec 1908]
General Staff College

Chiefs of the General Staff
Note: The given rank for each person is the rank the person held at last, not the rank the person held at the time of their post as Chief of the Army General Staff. For example, the rank of Field Marshal existed only in 1872/73 and from 1898 onward.

See also
 Ministry of the Army

Notes

References

U.S. War Department, Handbook of Japanese Military Forces, TM-E 30-480 (1945; Baton Rouge and London: Louisiana State University Press, 1991, reprint).

Shin'ichi Kitaoka, "Army as Bureaucracy: Japanese Militarism Revisited", Journal of Military History, special issue 57 (October 1993): 67–83.

Imperial Japanese Army
Japan